The 1999 European Parliament election was a European election for all 626 members of the European Parliament held across the 15 European Union member states on 10, 11 and 13 June 1999. The voter turn-out was generally low, except in Belgium and Luxembourg, where voting is compulsory and where national elections were held that same day. This was the first election where Austria, Finland and Sweden voted alongside the other member states, having joined in 1995 and voted separately. The next election was held in 2004.

Final results

Results by country 
The national results as at 13 June 1999 are as follows:

Results by group

Communists/Far Left
The EUL/NGL group picked up one seat in the election and seven in the subsequent regrouping, raising its total from 34 to 42.

Social Democrats
The PES group did badly, losing 34 of its seats in the election and slipping to the second-biggest group.

Liberals/Liberal Democrats
The ELDR group did moderately well, picking up one seat in the election and seven in the regrouping, giving a total of 50 seats and retaining its place as the third biggest group. The European Radical Alliance (ERA) were not so fortunate and slipped badly, losing eight of its 21 members in the election.

Conservatives/Christian Democrats
The EPP group did well, picking up 23 seats in the election and nine in the regrouping, giving a total of 233 seats and overtaking the left to become the biggest group. To placate the increasingly eurosceptic British Conservatives, the group was renamed "EPP-ED" for the new Parliament, partly resurrecting the name of the former European Democrat group which was merged with the EPP in 1992.

National Conservatives
The Union for Europe (UFE) group slipped during the election and lost 17 seats. The group split during the regrouping, with Ireland's Fianna Fáil and Portugal's CDS/PP forming a new group called "Union for Europe of the Nations". UEN started the Fifth Parliament with 31 MEPs.

Far-Right Nationalists
No explicitly far-right group per se was in existence immediately before or after the election. All far-right MEPs that were elected sat as Independents (see below).

Greens/Regionalists
The Green Group solidified its position, picking up 11 seats in the election to give it 38 MEPs. The European Free Alliance members of the ERA joined with the Green Group to create the Greens/EFA group, which started the Fifth Parliament with 48 MEPs.

Eurosceptics
The I-EN group trod water, gaining six members in the election but losing five in the regrouping, leaving it with 16 members. The group was renamed "Europe of Democracies and Diversities" (EDD) for the new Parliament.

Independents
The Non-Inscrits did badly, losing 20 MEPs to the election. Disparate members (two from Belgium, five from France and eleven from Italy) tried to gain Group privilege by creating a group called the "Technical Group of Independent Members" (full title "Group for the technical co-ordination of groups and the defence of independent members", abbreviated to "TGI" or "TDI").  The attempt initially succeeded, with the group allowed to start the Fifth Parliament until the legal position could be checked. In September, the Constitutional Affairs Committee ruled that they lacked a coherent position ("political complexion") and were disbanded - the only group ever to be forcibly dissolved. The TGI members returned to the Non-Inscrits, increasing their number to 27.

See also 
Members of the European Parliament 1999–2004

Statistics

References

External links 
 European Election Studies www.europeanelectionstudies.net
 Outgoing parliament as of January 1999 (also includes June 1994)
 Outgoing parliament as of May 4th 1999 (last session of Fourth Parliament): source 1
 Outgoing parliament as of May 4th 1999 (last session of Fourth Parliament): source 2
 Election results as of June 13 1999, before regrouping
 Incoming parliament as of July 20th 1999 (first session of Fifth Parliament. Includes TGI a.k.a. TDI)
 Incoming parliament as of September 13 1999 (after TGI was forcibly dissolved)

 
1999 elections in Europe
June 1999 events in Europe